José Gaspar, also known by his nickname Gasparilla (supposedly lived c. 1756 – 1821), is an apocryphal Spanish pirate who terrorized the Gulf of Mexico from his base in southwest Florida during Florida's second Spanish period (1783 to 1821). Though details about his early life, motivations, and piratical exploits differ in various tellings, they agree that the 'Last of the Buccaneers" was a remarkably active pirate who amassed a huge fortune by taking many prizes and ransoming many hostages during his long career and that he died by leaping from his ship rather than face capture by the U.S. Navy, leaving behind his still-hidden treasure.

While Gaspar is a popular figure in Florida folklore, there is no evidence that he actually existed. No contemporaneous mention of his life or exploits have been found in Spanish or American ship logs, court records, newspapers, or other archives, and no physical artifacts linked to Gaspar have been discovered in the area where he supposedly established his "pirate kingdom." The earliest known written mention of José Gaspar was a short biography included in an early 1900s promotional brochure for the Gasparilla Inn on Gasparilla Island at Charlotte Harbor, the author of which freely admitted that the dramatic tale was a work of fiction "without a true fact in it". Subsequent retellings of the Gaspar legend are based upon this fanciful account, including the accidental inclusion of José Gaspar in a 1923 book on real pirates that has caused ongoing confusion about his historical authenticity.

José Gaspar's legend is celebrated in Tampa, Florida during the annual Gasparilla Pirate Festival, which was first held in 1904.

Legend
The story of José Gaspar's life and career vary in different tellings, especially regarding his origin. Most agree that Gaspar was born in Spain about 1756, served in the Spanish Navy until turning to piracy about 1783, and met his end in southwest Florida during a battle against the United States Navy in late 1821. However, the retellings differ greatly in the details.

Early years
In some versions of the story, Gaspar began life as a poverty-stricken Spanish youth who kidnapped a young girl for ransom. Captured and given the choice between prison and joining the navy, he chose to go to sea, where he served with distinction for several years before leading a mutiny against a tyrannical captain and fleeing to Florida with a stolen ship.

Other versions of the story state that Gaspar was a nobleman who achieved a high rank in the Spanish Royal Navy and became a councilor to King Charles III of Spain. He was popular in the court, but when he spurned one lover for another, the jilted lady levied false charges against him, often said to involve the theft of the crown jewels. Unjustly facing arrest, he commandeered a ship and fled, vowing to exact revenge on his country.

In still other versions, Gaspar was a brilliant Spanish admiral of questionable character who actually succeeded in stealing the crown jewels. When his theft was discovered, he seized the "prize vessel of the Spanish fleet" with a group of loyal followers and abandoned his wife and children to flee across the Atlantic Ocean.

Piratical career
In all versions, the renegade settled along the virtually uninhabited southwest coast of Spanish Florida around 1783 and turned to piracy aboard his ship, the Floriblanca. Gaspar established a base on Gasparilla Island and was soon the feared scourge of the Gulf of Mexico and the Spanish Main, taking many ships as prizes and amassing a huge treasure cache in the period coinciding with the second Spanish rule of Florida. Most male prisoners would be forced to join his crew or be put to death, while women would be taken to a nearby isle (called Captiva Island for this reason) to be held for ransom or serve as wives or concubines for the pirates.

Different versions of Gaspar's legend relate different episodes in his piratical career. One of the most famous involves a Spanish princess (or Mexican, depending on the version) named Useppa who was a passenger on a captured ship. The noble woman rejected the pirate's advances until he threatened to behead her if she would not submit to his lust. Still she refused, and he killed her in a rage (or alternately, because his crew demanded her death). Gaspar instantly regretted the deed and took her body to a nearby island, which he named Useppa in her honor, and buried her himself. Some versions identify the lady with Josefa de Mayorga, daughter of Martín de Mayorga, viceroy of New Spain from 1779 to 1782, and contend that the island's name evolved over time. However, no evidence has been found to support this claim.

Similarly, Sanibel Island is said to have been named by Gaspar's first mate, Rodrigo Lopez, after his lover whom he had left back in Spain. Empathizing with his friend's plight, Gaspar eventually allowed Lopez to return home. Some versions of the legend claim that Gaspar entrusted Lopez with his personal log or diary, which have been cited as sources for information about the pirate although neither has ever been produced.

Gaspar has been associated with various other pirates, both historical and not. Some versions of Gaspar's story claim that he often partnered with the real pirate Pierre Lafitte and that Lafitte barely escaped the battle in which Gaspar was killed. This is unlikely, as there is no record of Lafitte spending time on the southwest Florida coast, and he died in Mexico before Gaspar's supposed demise. Gaspar has also been associated with Henri Caesar and "Old King John", other semi-legendary pirates for whom there is little to no historical evidence.

Demise
Most versions of the legend agree that José Gaspar met his end in late 1821, soon after Spain transferred control of the Florida Territory to the United States. Gaspar had decided to retire after almost four decades of pirating, and he and his crew gathered on Gasparilla Island to split the wealth he'd gathered throughout his career, which some versions of the story value at the enormous sum of $30 million. (For comparison, Spain had just agreed to transfer all of Florida to the United States for $5 million.)

During the treasure distribution process, a lookout spotted what appeared to be a vulnerable British merchant ship sailing nearby. Gaspar could not resist taking one last prize, so he led his crew aboard the Floriblanca to pursue their prey. However, when the pirates fired a warning shot, their intended victim raised an American flag to reveal that it was no merchant vessel, but the United States Navy pirate hunting schooner USS Enterprise in disguise. A fierce battle ensued in which the Floriblanca was hulled several times below the waterline and began to sink. Rather than surrender, Gaspar supposedly wrapped an anchor chain around his waist and leapt from the bow, dramatically shouting "Gasparilla dies by his own hand, not the enemy's!" before plunging into the waters of the Gulf of Mexico within sight of the shore. Most of his surviving crew were captured and hanged, but a few escaped or were imprisoned. Some versions of the story claim that one of the escapees was John Gómez, who would tell the tale to subsequent generations.

Plausibility

Historical context
Though his story has been retold in many forms since its first appearance around 1900, there is no evidence that the pirate José Gaspar existed. The period in which he was supposedly active was well after the "Golden Age of Piracy" (c. 1650 - 1725), when real historical figures such as Bartholomew Roberts, Blackbeard, and William Kidd operated in and around the Caribbean Sea and Atlantic basin. European nations began to make a concerted effort to suppress piracy in the early 1700s, and by 1730, every major pirate of the "golden age" era had been killed. While scattered seaborne attacks by privateers and others were still an occasional issue when Gaspar supposedly arrived at Charlotte Harbor in the 1780s, the navies of Britain, France, Spain, and the newly independent United States were actively patrolling nearby waters, making it improbable that a pirate could successfully harass shipping for decades at the enormous scale claimed in the various stories about Gasparilla. In addition, few pirates of any age based their operations along Florida's west coast. The vast majority of loot taken by real-life pirates consisted not of gold doubloons but of easily liquidated trade goods, and there were no nearby towns where stolen cargo could be sold.

Archival evidence

Several historians and other interested parties have attempted to find documentation of Gaspar's existence without success. Research in Spanish archives has turned up no mention of his early life, his presence in the Spanish royal court, or his career in the Spanish navy. Despite claims that he was the most feared pirate in the Gulf of Mexico for several decades, searches of contemporary American newspapers have found no mention of the name "Gaspar" or "Gasparilla" or of a pirate ship called Floriblanca, and searches of U.S. Navy archives have found no mention of Gaspar in ships' logs or in official court records of the hundreds of piracy trials held during the era. While the USS Enterprise was assigned to the West Indies Squadron tasked with suppressing piracy in the Caribbean, it is documented to have been in Cuba in December 1821, not in Charlotte Harbor, where Gaspar's last battle is said to have taken place.

Local place names
There is no evidence to support the claim that several local place names in southwest Florida originated with Gaspar, as many appeared on maps drawn long before his supposedly arrival in the 1780s. "Gasparilla Island" appears on Spanish and English maps made in the early 1700s, and contemporary documents suggest that the barrier island was named for Friar Gaspar, a Spanish missionary who visited the native Calusa in the 1600s. While several purported biographies of the pirate state that the nickname "Gasparilla" means "Gaspar, the outlaw" in Spanish, it is actually a feminine diminutive meaning "little Gaspar" or "gentle Gaspar", a moniker more likely to be attached to a pacifist priest than a bloodthirsty buccaneer.

Physical evidence
There is also no physical evidence to support Gaspar's existence. All versions of the Gasparilla legend claim that he and his crew constructed a "regal" home base on the island, with some specifying that it consisted of over a dozen buildings plus a tall watchtower perched atop an "ancient Indian mound" filled with gold and bones. However, no trace of this "pirate kingdom" has ever been uncovered despite the fact that the island became a key shipping point for Florida's phosphate industry in the early 20th century and the resort town of Boca Grande now encompasses most of its land area.

And while rumors of mysterious maps and gold coins have prompted professional and amateur treasure hunters to conduct many searches for Gaspar's lost cache over the years, there has been no documented recovery of any part of his plunder or the remains of his many alleged victims. However, amateur gold seekers have repeatedly disrupted nearby archeological sites, often in violation of Florida law. As described by the Boca Grande Historical Society, several Calusa and other Native American sites around Charlotte Harbor have suffered "unimaginable damage" at the hands of "looters in search of a non-pirate's non-treasure."

Sources of the legend

John Gómez

John Gómez (also known as Juan Gómez and Panther John) was a real person who has become entangled with the legend of José Gaspar. In the late 1800s, Gómez lived in a shack with his wife on otherwise uninhabited Panther Key, a small spit of land near Marco Island in the Ten Thousand Islands region of Southwest Florida. He was well known along Florida's Gulf coast as an expert hunting and fishing guide, boat pilot, and an eccentric teller of tall tales, mostly about himself. His self-reported age and birthplace varied, even on official documents. In the 1870 United States Census, he is listed as having been born in 1828. However, during the 1880 US census, Gómez claimed to have been born in France in 1785. In 1885, he told state census takers that he had been born in Corsica, and reported to the 1900 US Census that he was born in Portugal in 1776. Meanwhile, various contemporary letters and news articles report that Gómez claimed at different times to have been born in 1778, 1781 or 1795 in Honduras, Portugal, or Mauritius. Most of his supposed birth years would have made him one of the oldest people in the world in 1900, when he died in a boating accident.

Gómez's uncertain birth was said to be just the beginning of an exceedingly long and adventure-filled life. He claimed to have seen Napoleon as a youth in France (or, alternatively, was drafted into Napoleon's army), sailed the world as a cabin boy on a merchant ship, served as a scout for the U.S. Army during the Seminole Wars, served as a coastal pilot for the U.S. Navy during the Civil War, was involved in filibustering (and perhaps pirating) in Central America and the Caribbean, and escaped a Cuban prison just before his scheduled execution, among other remarkable exploits spread out over the entirety of the 19th century. While none of these stories can be verified, researchers have found record indicating that Gómez lived in several locations around southwest Florida from about 1870 until his death, including the Florida Everglades, Key West, Tampa, Pass-a-Grille, and the Ten Thousand Islands.

Between his propensity for telling entertaining stories and his real skills as a boat pilot and outdoorsman, Gómez became a popular fishing and hunting guide along Florida's west coast, leading to his being mentioned in several issues of Forest and Stream, an early conservationist magazine. His tall tales were usually shared in very informal settings during fishing trips and hunting expeditions and are only documented in a few personal accounts in newspapers and magazines and in his obituary. However, though many versions of the Gasparilla legend claim that Gómez was the last surviving member of the pirate's crew, no contemporary account of Gómez's life or tall tales mention José Gaspar. The connection was first made soon after his death in 1900, when a promotional pamphlet for a Charlotte Harbor resort hotel (see below) claimed that the late John Gómez was the primary source of its tale of the pirate Gasparilla.

Since then, many elaborate and often conflicting stories have been told regarding Gómez's alleged exploits alongside José Gaspar. Some claim that Gómez was the pirate's cabin boy, others that he was Gaspar's brother-in-law and first mate, still others that Gómez was Gaspar's first mate while his son was a cabin boy, and some even suggest that Gómez was the extraordinarily long-lived José Gaspar himself living under a false name. Most versions of the legend also claim that Gómez knew the whereabouts of Gaspar's vast treasure cache, which seems unlikely given that he petitioned the Lee County Commission for a $8 per month stipend due to destitution.

Gasparilla Inn Brochure

The first known written account of José Gaspar comes from an early 1900s brochure for the Gasparilla Inn Resort in the recently established tourist town of Boca Grande, Florida on Gasparilla Island in Charlotte Harbor. It was authored by publicist Pat Lemoyne for the Charlotte Harbor and Northern Railway Company, which had just opened the resort. The brochure consisted of two parts: a telling of the legend of José Gaspar followed by a promotional section touting the Gasparilla Inn and the Charlotte Harbor area in general. It was freely distributed to guests at the Inn and in northern markets to draw attention to the recently opened tourist destination.

The cover of the brochure featured a blood-dripping color illustration of Gaspar, and the introduction claimed that the tale of the pirate contained therein was gleaned from stories told by the recently deceased John Gómez, who was described as the longest-lived member the crew. Several episodes in Gaspar's career first mentioned in the brochure have been repeated and expanded upon in later retellings, including the tale of the "little Spanish princess" and the details of his dramatic demise. It also sought to connect Gaspar to Charlotte Harbor by claiming that his sprawling home base had encompassed several islands in the area. Captiva Island was said to be where his captives were held, Sanibel Island was named after Gaspar's love interest, and his home was on Gasparilla Island - "Taking the best of everything when a capture was made, he chose the best of the islands in Charlotte Harbor for his own secret haunts," it declared. Finally, it claimed that a burial mound "forty feet high and four hundred feet in circumference" near Gasparilla Island had been found to contain "ornaments of gold and silver" along with "hundreds of human skeletons", but that the bulk of the buccaneer's vast cache of buried treasure "still lies unmoved" nearby, in the vicinity of the Gasparilla Inn.

Though the brochure presents its "romantic" history of Gaspar as well-established truth, it is entirely fictional. Local place names mentioned were established long before the pirate's supposed arrival, and despite lurid tales regarding the uncovering of gold and human remains, no such artifacts or any other physical evidence of Gaspar's "regal" home base, victims, or treasure has ever been found on Gasparilla Island or anywhere else in the Charlotte Harbor area.

In 1949, a retired Pat Lemoyne gave a history lecture at a Fort Myers Chamber of Commerce function in which he cheerfully admitted that his biography of José Gaspar was a "cockeyed lie without a true fact in it" and that he had written the brochure in a dramatic style that "tourists like to hear". He explained that the story had been inspired by John Gómez's tall tales, which Lemoyne had heard second-hand. Lemoyne described Gómez as a "colorful" eccentric who claimed to have been a pirate in order to sell fake treasure maps to "the gullible" for a "fancy figure".

Piracy in the West Indies and Its Suppression
In 1923, Boston historian Francis B. C. Bradlee received a copy of the Gasparilla Inn brochure from Robert Bradley, then president of the Charlotte Harbor and Northern Railway Company. Assuming that the story of Gasparilla as described was authentic, Bradlee included many details in his book Piracy In The West Indies And Its Suppression without attempting to verify the information. His book repeated claims that a "burying ground" containing the "bleached bones" of Gaspar's many victims had recently been discovered on Gasparilla Island, that a tall "burial mound" built by a "prehistoric race" had been excavated and found to be full of gold and silver artifacts along with "hundreds of human skeletons", and that a dying John Gómez had confessed to witnessing the murder of the "Little Spanish princess" and sketched a map that led searchers to her body. However, none of these claims were true, as no treasure, murder victims, or other physical trace of Gaspar's exploits has ever been found in the area, and John Gómez drowned while fishing alone, making a deathbed confession impossible.

Despite his obvious lack of fact-checking, Bradlee's book was used as a source for later works such as Philip Gosse's Pirates' Who's Who and Frederick W. Dau's Florida Old and New, the authors of which also took Gaspar's authenticity for granted. Over the next few decades, several more books about pirates or Florida history erroneously included José Gaspar / Gasparilla as a real historical figure, leading to continuing confusion about his historical authenticity and repeated attempts to find his lost treasure.

Ye Mystic Krewe of Gasparilla
Inspired by the story of Gaspar, the city of Tampa organized a pirate-themed May Day festival in 1904. The event proved popular, and leading citizens organized "Ye Mystic Krewe of Gasparilla", an organization based on the krewes of Mardi Gras in New Orleans, to run the annual Gasparilla Pirate Festival. In 1936, YMKG commissioned Tampa Tribune editor Edwin D. Lambright to write an authorized history of the organization. Along with a factual history of the krewe and the Gasparilla festival up to that point, the volume included a version of the legend of José Gaspar in which he was depicted as a "respectable" and "courtly" pirate who only resorted to violence when absolutely necessary. Lambright claimed that his biography of Gaspar was supported by "unquestionable records", including a diary written by the pirate himself and taken to Spain by a member of his crew, perhaps Juan Gómez. However, the diary was said to have been lost, and no other evidence was disclosed.

In 2004, YMKG published a new centennial history of the organization. This document recounts the Gasparilla legend first published in 1936 but adds a coda which concedes that scholarly research conducted in both Spanish and American archives has not uncovered any evidence of Gaspar's existence. The history concludes with this statement:

Whether Gasparilla, the pirate, actually existed or not is a moot point. The legend exists, and that's what matters. The story of Gasparilla and his pirates has lent a certain flair of mystery and adventure to Florida's West Coast since the late 1800s. And on that legend, Ye Mystic Krewe of Gasparilla was founded 100 years ago.

"The Gasparilla Story"
In 1949, Fort Myers author Jack Beater published a mass-market paperback version of the Gaspar legend called The Gasparilla Story. Though written in the style of a light adventure novel, the narrator claimed that it was a true tale gleaned from a "mouse-eaten Cuban manuscript" supposedly written by José Gaspar's cousin Leon and corroborated with an old map found at a used bookstore, neither of which were made public. The book also included advertisements for hotels and real estate firms in the Fort Myers and Charlotte Harbor area and invited readers to “Make [their] conquest of Sanibel and Captiva Islands . . . in the manner of the buccaneers!"

Beater published several additional books about southwest Florida; some marketed as fiction, some as non-fiction, and some as guidebooks for tourists, all including tongue-in-cheek dramatic tales about Gaspar and other pirates. His works and the writings of other local authors with similar themes served to further expand the story of Gaspar while also sowing confusion about the veracity of the legend.

"The Hand of Gasparilla"

In the 1930s, construction worker Ernesto Lopez showed his family a mysterious box he claimed to have found while working with a repair crew on the Cass Street Bridge in downtown Tampa. According to family stories, the wooden box contained a pile of Spanish and Portuguese coins, a severed hand wearing a ring engraved with the name "Gaspar", and a "treasure map" indicating that Gaspar's treasure was hidden near the Hillsborough River in Tampa.

In 2015, Lopez's great-grandchildren found a box in their late grandfather's attic which appeared to contain the items found by Ernesto Lopez along with his wedding photo. The family brought the box to the attention of a local reporter, whose TV news report on the strange find was picked up by several national and international news outlets. However, upon examination, experts at the Tampa Bay History Center determined that the box contained several non-precious old coins, souvenirs from early Gasparilla parades, and a plat map from the 1920s with local streets, businesses, and landmarks from that time clearly depicted. The origin of the hand remained a mystery, though the curator of the history center opined that it might be a mummified monkey hand.

Legacy

Gasparilla Pirate Festival

In 1904, members of the Tampa business elite staged a surprise pirate "invasion" during the city's previously sedate May Day celebration. Under the guise of "Ye Mystic Krewe of Gasparilla" (YMKG), an organization modeled after the New Orleans Mardi Gras krewes, the "invaders" donned pirate costumes and rode through the streets on horseback encouraging residents to follow them to the festivities. The event was a hit, and the following year, the Krewe organized a parade in which all 60 of Tampa's cars rode through downtown. The first seaborne "invasion" came in 1911, and YMKG has organized a theatrical pirate invasion and parade almost every year since.

Tampa now hosts many community events during its "Gasparilla Season", which runs approximately from January to March. The focal point is still an "invasion" by José Gaspar and his crew, which takes place on the last Saturday in January. Members of Ye Mystic Krewe of Gasparilla, accompanied by a flotilla of hundreds of private boats, sail across Tampa Bay to downtown Tampa on the José Gasparilla, a 165' long "pirate" ship which was specially built for this purpose in 1954. The mayor of Tampa then surrenders the key of the city to the "pirate captain", and a "victory parade" ensues down Bayshore Boulevard. Dozens of other Krewes have joined the festivities over the years, which has grown into of one of the largest parades in the United States. An average of over 300,000 people attend the event, which contributes over $20 million to the local economy.

Cultural connections
Since no one organization controls the names "Gaspar" or "Gasparilla", they are used by many businesses, organizations, and events in the greater Tampa Bay area. Others have names inspired by the mythical pirate, such as the Tampa Bay Buccaneers of the National Football League, who began play in 1976. Another sports-related example is the Gasparilla Bowl, a college football bowl game once played in Tropicana Field as the "St. Petersburg Bowl" that changed its name when it moved to Tampa in 2018.

The legend of Gasparilla has been featured in several television shows and publications over the years. Recent examples include September 2019 episodes of the TV series Expedition Unknown on the Discovery Channel and Code of the Wild on the Travel Channel, both of which followed amateur treasure hunters (unsuccessfully) searching for Gaspar's treasure in the Charlotte Harbor area.

References

Bradlee, Francis Boardman. Piracy in the West Indies and its Suppression (1923). Essex Institute. Salem, MA. full text at archive.org

Florida folklore
Florida culture
History of Tampa, Florida
Legendary American people
Fictional Spanish people
19th-century pirates
Maritime folklore
Fictional pirates